Jessica María Scheel Noyola (born January 13, 1990 in Guatemala) is a Guatemalan model and beauty pageant titleholder who has competed at the Miss Guatemala, Miss Earth 2007 and Miss Universe 2010 pageant.

Pageantry

Miss Guatemala 2010
Jessica competed in Miss Guatemala 2010 where she was crowned as Miss Guatemala International 2010 in a pageant held in the country's capital Guatemala City on April 25, 2010.

Miss Universe 2010
Because Barrillas was unable to participate in Miss Universe 2010 she was replaced by Scheel. Scheel placed among the Top 15, breaking a 26-year non-placement streak for Guatemala. Jessica would later finish in the Top 10. During the evening gown competition her name was incorrectly given as "Jessica Torres".

Notes
 Scheel was originally 2nd Runner-Up (or Miss Guatemala International), but competed in Miss Universe after the original titleholder, Alejandra Barrillas, was unable to compete after she injured her left foot in an accident.

References

External links
 Profile: Guatemala - Jessica Scheel 

Living people
Miss Universe 2010 contestants
Miss Earth 2007 contestants
Miss Guatemala winners
1990 births
Guatemalan beauty pageant winners
Guatemalan female models